Mae Ella Nolan (September 20, 1886 – July 9, 1973) was an American politician who became the fourth woman to serve in the United States Congress, the first woman elected to Congress from California, the first woman to chair a Congressional committee, and the first to fill the seat left vacant by her husband's death. She took her seat in the United States House of Representatives in 1923.

Biography 
Mae Nolan was born in San Francisco, California, and attended public schools, St. Vincent's Convent, and Ayres Business College of San Francisco.

Congress 
Nolan was elected as a Republican to the 67th Congress by special election to fill the vacancy caused by the death of her husband, John Ignatius Nolan, on November 18, 1922. She served in the 67th and 68th Congresses, from January 23, 1923, to March 3, 1925.

 Nolan was the fourth woman elected to Congress, after Jeannette Rankin, Alice Mary Robertson, and Winnifred Sprague Mason Huck. All four were elected as Republicans to the House of Representatives. Nolan was a Catholic, hence she was the first woman from such a background who served in the federal legislature.

Nolan was the first woman elected to her husband's seat in Congress, which is sometimes known as the "widow's succession". As of 2004, 36 widows have won their husbands' seats in the House, and 8 in the Senate. Recent examples are Representatives Mary Bono (widow of Sonny Bono) and Lois Capps and Doris Matsui, all of California, and Jo Ann Emerson of Missouri. The most successful example is Margaret Chase Smith of Maine, who served a total of 32 years in both houses and became the first woman elected to both the House and the Senate. The third woman elected to Congress, Winnifred Huck, was similarly elected to her father's seat.

Nolan initially supported her late husband's stance on women's suffrage, but later supported the right of women to vote. During her term, she was the chairman of the Committee on Expenditures in the Post Office Department. She was not a candidate for renomination in 1924 to the 69th Congress, claiming "politics is man's business".

Death
Nolan moved to Sacramento, California in her later years, where she died. She was interred in Holy Cross Cemetery in Colma.

See also 
 Women in the United States House of Representatives

References 
 
 Associated Press. "Husbands' deaths often propel widows to office". Columbia Daily Tribune, January 22, 2005. Retrieved February 15, 2005. (alternate source)
 Office of History and Preservation, Office of the Clerk, U.S. House of Representatives (2006). "'I'm No Lady, I'm a Member of Congress': Women Pioneers on Capitol Hill, 1917–1934". Women in Congress 1917–2006. U.S. Government Printing Office. pp. 24–25.

|-

1886 births
1973 deaths
Burials at Holy Cross Cemetery (Colma, California)
Catholics from California
Female members of the United States House of Representatives
Republican Party members of the United States House of Representatives from California
Women in California politics
20th-century American politicians
20th-century American women politicians